A painter is a rope that is attached to the bow of a dinghy, or other small boat, and used for tying up or towing. Ideally, the painter should float.
If used on a boat with a propeller, the length of the painter should be shorter than the distance to the propeller, to prevent fouling the engine.

Canoeing
Canoes being used in moving water or whitewater are rigged with a painter at both the bow and stern.  In addition to the functions mentioned above, a canoe's painters can be used for lining the boat down difficult sections, self-rescue, and boat recovery.

See also 

Knot
List of hitch knots
List of knots

References

Nautical terminology
Sailing rigs and rigging